The 2018 NCAA Division I Men's Golf Championship was the 80th annual tournament to determine the national champions of NCAA Division I men's golf. It was contested from May 25 to 30 at the Karsten Creek in Stillwater, Oklahoma and hosted by Oklahoma State.

Oklahoma State won its 11th team championship, defeating Alabama 5–0 in the finals. Broc Everett of Augusta won the individual championship in a sudden-death playoff over Brandon Mancheno of Auburn.

Qualifying
The five teams with the lowest team scores qualified from each of the six regional tournaments for both the team and individual national championships.
The lowest scoring individual not affiliated with one of the qualified teams in their regional also qualified for the individual national championship.

Regional tournaments

Team competition

Leaderboard
After 54 holes, the field of 30 teams was cut to the top 15.

Remaining teams: Northwestern (884), Stanford (884), Florida (886), Iowa State (891), UNLV (891), Kentucky (892), UCLA (892), Kansas (894), BYU (897), NC State (897), 
Central Florida (897), Oregon (899), North Florida (902), Augusta (904), Baylor (910).

Match play bracket
The eight teams with the lowest total scores advanced to the match play bracket.

Source:

Individual competition
The field was cut after 54 holes to the top 15 teams and the top nine individuals not on a top 15 team. These 84 players competed for the individual championship.

^ Everett won on the first hole of a sudden-death playoff.

References

NCAA Men's Golf Championship
Golf in Oklahoma
NCAA Division I Men's Golf Championship
NCAA Division I Men's Golf Championship
NCAA Division I Men's Golf Championship
NCAA Division I Men's Golf Championship